
A highly composite number is a positive integer with more divisors than any smaller positive integer has. A related concept is that of a largely composite number, a positive integer which has at least as many divisors as any smaller positive integer. The name can be somewhat misleading, as the first two highly composite numbers (1 and 2) are not actually composite numbers; however, all further terms are.

Ramanujan wrote a paper on highly composite numbers in 1915.

The mathematician Jean-Pierre Kahane suggested that Plato must have known about highly composite numbers as he deliberately chose such a number, 5040 (=7!), as the ideal number of citizens in a city.

Examples
The initial or smallest 38 highly composite numbers are listed in the table below  . The number of divisors is given in the column labeled d(n). Asterisks indicate superior highly composite numbers.

The divisors of the first 15 highly composite numbers are shown below.

The table below shows all 72 divisors of 10080 by writing it as a product of two numbers in 36 different ways.

The 15,000th highly composite number can be found on Achim Flammenkamp's website. It is the product of 230 primes:

 

where  is the sequence of successive prime numbers, and all omitted terms (a22 to a228) are factors with exponent equal to one (i.e. the number is ). More concisely, it is the product of seven distinct primorials:

 

where  is the primorial .

Prime factorization
Roughly speaking, for a number to be highly composite it has to have prime factors as small as possible, but not too many of the same. By the fundamental theorem of arithmetic, every positive integer n has a unique prime factorization:

where  are prime, and the exponents  are positive integers.

Any factor of n must have the same or lesser multiplicity in each prime:

So the number of divisors of n is:

Hence, for a highly composite number n,

 the k given prime numbers pi must be precisely the first k prime numbers (2, 3, 5, ...); if not, we could replace one of the given primes by a smaller prime, and thus obtain a smaller number than n with the same number of divisors (for instance 10 = 2 × 5 may be replaced with 6 = 2 × 3; both have four divisors);

Also, except in two special cases n = 4 and n = 36, the last exponent ck must equal 1. It means that 1, 4, and 36 are the only square highly composite numbers. Saying that the sequence of exponents is non-increasing is equivalent to saying that a highly composite number is a product of primorials or, alternatively, the smallest number for its prime signature.

Note that although the above described conditions are necessary, they are not sufficient for a number to be highly composite. For example, 96 = 25 × 3 satisfies the above conditions and has 12 divisors but is not highly composite since there is a smaller number 60 which has the same number of divisors.

Asymptotic growth and density
If Q(x) denotes the number of highly composite numbers less than or equal to x, then there are two constants a and b, both greater than 1, such that

The first part of the inequality was proved by Paul Erdős in 1944 and the second part by Jean-Louis Nicolas in 1988.  We have

and

Related sequences

Highly composite numbers higher than 6 are also abundant numbers. One need only look at the three largest proper divisors of a particular highly composite number to ascertain this fact. It is false that all highly composite numbers are also Harshad numbers in base 10. The first HCN that is not a Harshad number is 245,044,800, which has a digit sum of 27, but 27 does not divide evenly into 245,044,800.

10 of the first 38 highly composite numbers are superior highly composite numbers.
The sequence of highly composite numbers  is a subset of the sequence of smallest numbers k with exactly n divisors .

Highly composite numbers whose number of divisors is also a highly composite number are for n = 1, 2, 6, 12, 60, 360, 1260, 2520, 5040, 55440, 277200, 720720, 3603600, 61261200, 2205403200, 293318625600, 6746328388800, 195643523275200 . It is extremely likely that this sequence is complete.

A positive integer n is a largely composite number if d(n) ≥ d(m) for all m ≤ n.  The counting function QL(x) of largely composite numbers satisfies

Because the prime factorization of a highly composite number uses all of the first k primes, every highly composite number must be a practical number. Due to their ease of use in calculations involving fractions, many of these numbers are used in traditional systems of measurement and engineering designs.

See also
 Superior highly composite number
 Highly totient number
 Table of divisors
 Euler's totient function
 Round number
 Smooth number

Notes

References
 

 Annotated and with a foreword by Jean-Louis Nicolas and Guy Robin.

External links 
 
 Algorithm for computing Highly Composite Numbers
 First 10000 Highly Composite Numbers as factors
  Achim Flammenkamp, First 779674 HCN with sigma,tau,factors
 Online Highly Composite Numbers Calculator

 5040 and other Anti-Prime Numbers - Dr. James Grime by Dr. James Grime for Numberphile

Integer sequences